Eduardo Ortega is a Mexican-American baseball broadcaster. He has worked as the Spanish language broadcaster of the San Diego Padres of Major League Baseball (MLB) since 1987.

Ortega began announcing baseball in Mexico when he was 20 years old. Four years later, he was hired by the Padres. He works for ESPN Deportes during the MLB postseason, and has also announced the MLB All-Star Game and World Baseball Classic. He was a finalist for the Ford C. Frick Award in the 2013 balloting, and was again a finalist in 2014.

References

Living people
Year of birth missing (living people)
Place of birth missing (living people)
American radio sports announcers
Major League Baseball broadcasters
Mexican emigrants to the United States
San Diego Padres announcers
Sportspeople from Tijuana
American sportspeople of Mexican descent